Andrew Michael Odlyzko (Andrzej Odłyżko) (born 23 July 1949) is a Polish-American mathematician and a former head of the University of Minnesota's Digital Technology Center and of the Minnesota Supercomputing Institute.  He began his career in 1975 at Bell Telephone Laboratories, where he stayed for 26 years before joining the University of Minnesota in 2001.

Work in mathematics 

Odlyzko received his B.S. and M.S. in mathematics from the California Institute of Technology and his Ph.D. from the Massachusetts Institute of Technology in 1975.  

In the field of mathematics he has published extensively on analytic number theory, computational number theory, cryptography, algorithms and computational complexity, combinatorics, probability, and error-correcting codes.  In the early 1970s, he was a co-author (with D. Kahaner and Gian-Carlo Rota) of one of the founding papers of the modern umbral calculus.  In 1985 he and Herman te Riele disproved the Mertens conjecture.  In mathematics, he is probably known best for his work on the Riemann zeta function, which led to the invention of improved algorithms, including the Odlyzko–Schönhage algorithm, and large-scale computations, which stimulated extensive research on connections between the zeta function and random matrix theory.

As a direct collaborator of Paul Erdős, he has Erdős number 1.

Work on electronic communication 

More recently, he has worked on communication networks, electronic publishing, economics of security and electronic commerce.

In 1998, he and Kerry Coffman were the first to show that one of the great inspirations for the Internet bubble, the myth of "Internet traffic doubling every 100 days," was false.

In the paper  "Content is Not King", published in First Monday in January 2001, he argues that
 the entertainment industry is a small industry compared with other industries, notably the telecommunications industry;
 people are more interested in communication than entertainment;
 and therefore that entertainment "content" is not the killer app for the Internet.

In 2012, he became a fellow of the International Association for Cryptologic Research and in 2013 of the American Mathematical Society.

Network value 

In the 2006 paper "Metcalfe's Law is Wrong", Andrew Odlyzko and coauthors argue that the incremental value of adding one person to a network of n people is approximately the nth harmonic number, so the total value of the network is approximately n * log(n).  Since this curves upward (unlike Sarnoff's law), it implies that Metcalfe's conclusion – that there is a critical mass in networks, leading to a network effect – is qualitatively correct.  But since this linearithmic function does not grow as rapidly as Metcalfe's law, it implies that many of the quantitative expectations based on Metcalfe's law were excessively optimistic.

For example, by Metcalfe, if a hypothetical network of 100,000 members has a value of $1M, doubling its membership would increase its value fourfold (200,0002/100,0002). However Odlyzko predicts its value would only slightly more than double: 200,000*log(200,000)/(100,000*log(100,000). Empirical tests, in part stimulated by this criticism, strongly support Metcalfe's law.

Financial History 

In recent years, Odlyzko has published multiple papers on the financial history of bubbles, particularly the South Sea Bubble and the English Railway Mania of the eighteenth and nineteenth centuries, respectively.

See also 

 Binomial type
 Digital media
 Metcalfe's law
 Montgomery's pair correlation conjecture
 Reed's law
 Riemann hypothesis

References

External links 
 Andrew Odlyzko: Home Page
 Digital Technology Center at the University of Minnesota
 Andrew Odlyzko, Tragic loss or good riddance? The impending demise of traditional scholarly journals
 Andrew Odlyzko, Content is Not King, First Monday, Vol. 6, No. 2 (5 February 2001).
 Montgomery–Odlyzko law at MathWorld

Living people
20th-century American mathematicians
21st-century American mathematicians
Polish emigrants to the United States
Scientists at Bell Labs
California Institute of Technology alumni
Massachusetts Institute of Technology School of Science alumni
University of Minnesota faculty
Fellows of the American Mathematical Society
1949 births
International Association for Cryptologic Research fellows